Gambit, also called Gambit-C, is a programming language, a variant of the language family Lisp, and its variants named Scheme. The Gambit implementation consists of a Scheme interpreter, and a compiler which compiles Scheme into the language C, which makes it cross-platform software. It conforms to the standards R4RS, R5RS, and Institute of Electrical and Electronics Engineers (IEEE), and to several Scheme Requests for Implementations (SRFIs). Gambit was released first in 1988, and Gambit-C (Gambit with a C backend) was released first in 1994. They are free and open-source software released under a GNU Lesser General Public License (LGPL) 2.1, and Apache License 2.0.
	
By compiling to an intermediate representation, in this case portable C (as do Chicken, Bigloo and Cyclone), programs written in Gambit can be compiled for common popular operating systems such as Linux, macOS, other Unix-like systems, and Windows.

Gerbil Scheme 
Gerbil scheme is a variant of Scheme implemented on Gambit-C. It supports current R*RS standards and common SRFIs and has a state of the art macro and module system inspired by Racket language.

Termite Scheme
Termite Scheme is a variant of Scheme implemented on Gambit-C. Termite is intended for distributed computing, it offers a simple and powerful message passing model of concurrency, inspired by that of Erlang.

C++ and Objective-C integration
While the Gambit compiler produces C code only, it has full integration support for C++ and Objective-C compilers such as GNU Compiler Collection (GCC). Thus, software written in Gambit-C can contain C++ or Objective-C code, and can fully integrate with corresponding libraries.

See also
 Chicken (Scheme implementation)
 Stalin (Scheme implementation)

References

External links
 
 
 Termite home page on Google Code
 Gerbil Scheme homepage

Scheme (programming language) compilers
Scheme (programming language) interpreters
Scheme (programming language) implementations
Free compilers and interpreters